Lundie Craigs/Westerkeith Hill is one of the hills of the Sidlaw range in South East Perthshire.

Lundie Craigs/Westerkeith Hill is located near Coupar Angus and is quite popular to dog walkers and hill walkers.

References

Mountains and hills of Perth and Kinross